= Gazil, West Virginia =

Unincorporated community in West Virginia, United States

- Unincorporated community
- Location within West Virginia and the United States Gazil (the United States)
- Coordinates: 38°23′5″N 81°19′13″W
- Country: United States
- State: West Virginia
- County: Kanawha
- Elevation: 1,401 ft (427 m)
- Time zone: UTC-5 (Eastern (EST))
  - Summer (DST): UTC-4 (EDT)
- GNIS ID: 1742077

Gazil was an unincorporated community in Kanawha County, West Virginia, United States. Its post office has been closed.
